Žganci is a dish in Slovenian and Croatian cuisine, known as Sterz in Austria, pura on the Croatian coast, and also known in northern Italy. It is a traditional "poor man's food" of hard-working farmhands similar to polenta, although prepared with finer grains.

Preparation
The dish is made from buckwheat flour, maize, wheat, or a combination of potato and wheat flour and water, cooking oil and salt, which is cooked for fifteen minutes on a low boil. The lump is then crumbled onto a plate for serving. Softer žganci is called Styrian style in Slovenia. Žganci can be served with milk (žganci z mlekom), honey, lard and cracklings, or runny yogurt. A savory version is served with meat as part of a main dish.

Žganci in Slovenia
Žganci was a typical everyday meal of the central and Alpine parts of Slovenia. Its popularity and common use is implied in the following witticism from the 19th century: "Žganci are the pedestal of Carniola." This attitude implies its crucial meaning for the survival of the population. Freshly boiled žganci could be served as breakfast or lunch, or warmed-up or toasted for dinner or breakfast the following day. Belsazar Hacquet (1739–1815) mentions that žganci was served with sauerkraut in Upper Carniola. The oldest preparation method explains the word žganci. The word žganci is derived from the Slovenian verb žgati 'to burn, to toast'.

See also

 Ga'at
 Grits
 Farina (food)
 Frico
 Hasty pudding
 List of maize dishes
 List of porridges
 Mămăligă
 Masa
 Mush
 Nshima
 Pap
 Pudding corn
 Schmarrn
 Sadza
 Ugali
 Upma

References

External links
 

Slovenian cuisine
Croatian cuisine
Wheat dishes